Yerkramas is an Armenian newspaper published in Krasnodar, Russia.

References

Armenian-language newspapers
Newspapers published in Russia
Krasnodar